Moreno Valley is a city in Riverside County, California, United States, and is part of the Riverside–San Bernardino–Ontario metropolitan area. It is the second-largest city in Riverside County by population and one of the Inland Empire's population centers. The city's population was 208,634 at the 2020 census. Moreno Valley is also part of the larger greater Los Angeles area.

The city derived its name from the small community of Moreno, which became part of the city of Moreno Valley when the city was incorporated in 1984. Frank E. Brown, one of the founders of the community of Moreno in 1882, declined to have the town named after him, but to honor him, the town was named Moreno, Spanish for brown.

History

Indigenous period
The Moreno Valley area was first inhabited 2,300 years ago. There are at least 200 prehistoric archaeological locations within the city. The majority of the sites are milling stations - where chaparral seed was the dominant milling activity. Rock art, consisting of pictographs, and petroglyphs are present - though most of the petroglyphs in Moreno Valley consist of boulders with "cupules",  or cup-shaped holes pecked into them.

Spanish & Mexican periods

Spanish scouts initially came across descendants of the Shoshone, and Luiseño tribes; although other groups, such as the Serrano and Cahuilla were in the area. The late prehistoric Luiseño and Cahuilla were semi-sedentary, meaning that they wintered in villages, then spread out in family groups during the spring and summer months to harvest seeds and acorns.

Spanish scouts blazed a number of trails in the area, including the Anza Trail, which runs through the Edgemont area of present-day Moreno Valley.

Post-Conquest period
When California was admitted to the United States as a state in 1850, Americans began to move into the area. The Tucson-to-San Francisco route of John Butterfield's Overland Mail Company passed through it. Some farmers began to occupy the area, relying upon water from Frank E. Brown's Bear Valley Land and Water Company. Beginning in 1883, the company collected and pumped water from Bear Valley in the San Bernardino Mountains to the north. The area first acquired its current name, Moreno Valley, at this time, referring to Frank Brown (moreno is Spanish for "brown" or "brunet"). In 1899, the city of Redlands won a lawsuit in which the city claimed eminent domain over the Bear Valley water. The resulting loss of service forced most of the area's inhabitants to move.

20th century
The revival of the Moreno Valley area began in 1918, when the United States Air Force (then the United States Army Air Service) constructed March Field on the outskirts of Riverside as part of its World War I expansion. March Field was initially used to train fighter pilots. Although it was closed in 1922, it was reopened in 1927 and eventually became a full Air Force base. The presence of March caused the unincorporated communities of Sunnymead, Moreno, and Edgemont to develop and grow. In World War II, March again became a training ground for military pilots. On April 1, 1996, March Air Force Base (MAFB) became March Joint Air Reserve Base (MJARB) under Air Force Reserve Command (AFRC).

From September 22, 1957, to July 3, 1989, the Riverside International Raceway (sometimes known as RIR, Riverside or Riverside Raceway) occupied the current site of the Moreno Valley Mall.  Some of the races held at RIR included IMSA, NASCAR, Indycar, NHRA drag racing, Go Karts, Formula 1, and AMA motorcycle racing.  When there was no racing, Riverside was used in TV shows, movies, advertisements  and was used by both Carroll Shelby and Skip Barber to teach students how to drive around the track.  The mall is now located where turns 5, 6 (NASCAR Road) and 8 used to be on the northern end near the freeway and houses now occupy the southern end of the raceway's property.

Incorporation and growth

By 1984, the population was 49,702 (compared to 18,871 residents in 1970). The state economic boom fueled the construction of new houses and businesses, leading to a push for the area to incorporate as a city. Although similar measures had failed previously in 1968 and 1983, the measure to form the city of Moreno Valley was approved by the area's voters in 1984. On December 3, 1984, the communities of Edgemont, Sunnymead, and Moreno united along with nearby areas to form the general law city of Moreno Valley. The first city council was also elected in 1984. It was composed of Bob Lynn, Judith A. Nieburger, Steven Webb, J. David Horspool (first Mayor Pro Tem), and Marshall C. Scott (first Mayor). The city seal and motto were adopted the following year.

By 1990, Moreno Valley had grown to become the second-largest city in Riverside County with a population of approximately 118,000. This growth continued until about 1992.

In the 1990s, the Moreno Valley economy deteriorated. Many residents began to leave the city. March Air Force Base was also downsized to its present status as March Air Reserve Base. The surplus land was given to the March Joint Powers Authority, made up of representatives of Riverside County, and the cities of Riverside, Moreno Valley, and Perris for development. The dismal economic trend began to reverse in the late part of the decade and companies such as Aurora Modular, U-Haul, and Lowe's moved major operating facilities to the city or neighboring cities (although Aurora later filed for bankruptcy).

By the early 2000s, the soaring cost of living in nearby Los Angeles County and Orange County helped make the less developed portions of the Inland Empire an attractive place for business and home construction.

March Air Reserve Base

Proposals to turn March Joint Air Reserve Base to a major commercial airport were debated in 2005, which would have given the Inland Empire a second commercial airport; there is currently a commercial airport in the city of Ontario. However, the plan was rejected by the Riverside County Board of Supervisors. In May 2008, the March Joint Powers Authority approved the facility for small general private aircraft.

DHL selected March Air Reserve Base as its Southern California hub and commenced operations in October 2005.  While initial claims were that the facility would employ 250 workers in its initial stage, over 300 employees went to work daily during normal operations. In November 2008, DHL announced it was leaving the U.S. market and would shut its operation associated with March Air Field in January 2009.

March Air Reserve base has a ball park facility, where the semi-pro baseball Rancho Belago Rockets of the Southern California League play in the summer months.

21st century
On February 13, 2007, the city council passed, by a vote of 4–1, a resolution christening the eastern half of the city (roughly from Lasselle Street to Gilman Springs Road) "Rancho Belago", a pastiche of Spanish and Italian words. The city council's resolution includes the 92555 ZIP Code within the boundaries of the area, as reported by the Press Enterprise newspaper.

Metrolink rail transit arrived in the area in 2016, as far south as Perris. A proposal to erect a four-lane road (known as Mid County Parkway) near the site of Cajalco Road/Ramona Expressway from Interstate 215 to State Route 79 in San Jacinto is currently being studied by Caltrans and Riverside County.

Geography

Moreno Valley is located at a geographic crossroad. To the east lies the San Gorgonio Pass and Coachella Valley; to the south are Lake Perris, Perris, and the San Jacinto Mountains; to the north are the San Bernardino Valley and San Bernardino Mountains. To the west lies neighboring Riverside. It is relatively close to Ontario International Airport.

One of the most visible geographical features in Moreno Valley is Box Springs Mountain. This mountain at the northwest end of the city rises over the city, providing a concrete landmark. The section of the mountain that faces the city has a large letter "M" constructed upon it. This was built privately at the encouragement of the city council, which argued it would foster unity. The letter is located on public land and is maintained entirely by charity. The letter had lights installed on December 3, 2005 to celebrate Moreno Valley's 21st anniversary of its incorporation. The completion of the repairs of heavy damage to the letter, due to extreme rain the year before. The mayor at that time, Bonnie Flickinger, has said that the citizens liked it that way and that the council would try to get it to light up regularly. Between December 2, 2009 and December 6, 2009, Moreno Valley, along with Edison lit up the letter in celebration of the city's 25th anniversary. Several Eagle Scout projects have been dedicated to maintaining the "M".

Climate
Moreno Valley has a mild semi-arid climate (Köppen BSh), with Mediterranean characteristics. The summer temperatures average in the high 90s, though many days reach well above 100°.
 On average, the warmest month is August.
 On average, the coolest month is December.
 The maximum average precipitation occurs in December.

Demographics

2017 Estimates
As of 2017, estimates from City-Data show that Moreno Valley's population was 207,226. It had 128,912 Latinos/Hispanics of any race (62.2%); 32,932 Black alone (15.9%); 27,586 White alone (13.3%); 12,510 Asian alone (6.0%); and 1,180 Native Hawaiian and Pacific Islander alone (0.6%). The population density was 4,045 people per square mile.

2010
The racial makeup of Moreno Valley was 36,546 (18.9%) non-Hispanic White, 34,889 (18.0%) African American, 1,721 (0.9%) Native American, 11,867 (6.1%) Asian, 1,117 (0.6%) Pacific Islander, 51,741 (26.8%) from other races, and 11,061 (5.7%) from two or more races. Hispanic or Latino of any race were 105,169 persons (54.4%).

The Census reported that 192,811 people (99.7% of the population) lived in households, 471 (0.2%) lived in non-institutionalized group quarters, and 83 (0.1%) were institutionalized.

There were 51,592 households, out of which 28,586 (55.4%) had children under the age of 18 living in them, 29,000 (56.2%) were opposite-sex married couples living together, 9,990 (19.4%) had a female householder with no husband present, 4,191 (8.1%) had a male householder with no wife present. There were 3,627 (7.0%) unmarried opposite-sex partnerships, and 375 (0.7%) same-sex married couples or partnerships. 6,094 households (11.8%) were made up of individuals, and 1,611 (3.1%) had someone living alone who was 65 years of age or older. The average household size was 3.74. There were 43,181 families (83.7% of all households); the average family size was 3.99.

The population was spread out, with 62,496 people (32.3%) under the age of 18, 23,563 people (12.2%) aged 18 to 24, 53,726 people (27.8%) aged 25 to 44, 41,446 people (21.4%) aged 45 to 64, and 12,134 people (6.3%) who were 65 years of age or older. The median age was 28.6 years. For every 100 females, there were 95.1 males. For every 100 females age 18 and over, there were 91.3 males.

The homeowner vacancy rate was 3.4%; the rental vacancy rate was 7.5%. 123,863 people (64.1% of the population) lived in owner-occupied housing units and 68,948 people (35.7%) lived in rental housing units.

During 2009–2013, Moreno Valley had a median household income of $54,918, with 19.5% of the population living below the federal poverty line.

2000
Latinos replaced the once majority White non-Hispanic population in the 1990s.

Moreno Valley has increasingly become a destination for African-American families from Los Angeles County. Between 2006 and 2007 alone, Moreno Valley saw a 13% increase in its Black population.

Also in the same time period, Latinos became the majority of over half the population, especially a large Mexican-American and Mexican population. There are several business strips catering to Spanish-speaking clientele and Latin American cultures.

There were 43,381 households, out of which 54.0% had children under the age of 18 living with them, 61.6% were married couples living together, 17.1% had a female householder with no husband present, and 14.9% were non-families. 11.0% of all households were made up of individuals, and 3.1% had someone living alone who was 65 years of age or older. The average household size was 3.6 and the average family size was 3.9.

In the city, there were 36.8% under the age of 18; 10.5% from 18 to 24; 29.5% from 25 to 44; 17.7% from 45 to 64; and 5.5% who were 65 years of age or older. The median age was 27 years. For every 100 females, there were 95.8 males. For every 100 females age 18 and over, there were 91.3 males.

The median income for a household in the city was $47,387, and the median income for a family was $48,965 (these figures had risen to $55,604 and $57,385 respectively as of a 2007 estimate). Males had a median income of $38,620 versus $26,492 for females. The per capita income for the city was $14,983. 14.2% of the population and 11.6% of families were below the poverty line. 18.1% of those under the age of 18 and 9.7% of those 65 and older were living below the poverty line.

Government

Local
Moreno Valley incorporated in 1984 as a general law city. It currently uses the council-manager form of government. The city is divided into four council districts, each of which elect a representative to the city council. The mayor is directly elected at-large. The council chooses one of its members to serve as Mayor Pro Tem. The council also selects the city manager, the city attorney, and city clerk.

The current City Council consists of:

 Mayor: Ulises Cabrera
 District 1: Elena Baca-Santa Cruz
 District 2: Ed Delgado
 District 3: David Marquez
 District 4: Cheylynda Barnard

State and federal

Public services

Public safety
Moreno Valley is served by its own regional station of the Riverside County Sheriff's Department for law enforcement. The sheriff's station is currently commanded by Sheriff's Captain Joel Ontiveros, who also functions as Moreno Valley's Chief of Police.

The city of Moreno Valley contracts for fire and paramedic services with the Riverside County Fire Department through a cooperative agreement with CAL FIRE. 7 paramedic engines and a truck company provide both fire and paramedic services to the city.

American Medical Response is responsible for transports to emergency departments via paramedic ambulance.

Education
Moreno Valley's primary and secondary education needs are fulfilled by the Moreno Valley Unified School District and the Val Verde Unified School District. The former serves approximately 35,000 students, the bulk of the city's children, and has 35 schools, including five high schools: Moreno Valley High School, Canyon Springs High School, Valley View High School, March Mountain High School, and Vista del Lago High School. Val Verde District serves part of southern and eastern Moreno Valley, in addition to parts of Perris, Mead Valley, and unincorporated areas. It serves about 13,000 students and maintains 12 schools; one of its high schools, Rancho Verde High School, is located in Moreno Valley. Some private schools exist, including the local Valley Christian Academy, established in 1979, and Calvary Chapel Christian School, which serves students Kindergarten to twelfth grade. There is also growing number of charter schools within Moreno Valley area including Excel Prep Charter School – Inland Empire, a K–6 school, Riverside County Educational Academy, and Audeo Charter School, a 6–12 independent study program.

The Riverside Community College District, RCCD, serves 6,500 students at their Moreno Valley College campus. The city is also the location of one of the twenty-six Chapman University campuses. In neighboring Riverside, students may opt to attend RCCD's main campus, Riverside Community College, the University of California, Riverside, La Sierra University or California Baptist University. California State University, San Bernardino is another popular school for city high school graduates.

Moreno Valley has three public libraries.

Transportation
The heavily traveled routes of State Route 60 (locally called the Moreno Valley Freeway) and Interstate 215 both pass through the city.

Metrolink offers commuter rail transit via the Moreno Valley/March Field station, located just west of the city limits. Monday through Friday service is provided on the 91 Line connecting the Moreno Valley area with Riverside and Downtown Los Angeles to the north and Perris to the south. The Riverside Transit Agency provides local and express/commuter bus services.

Economy
According to the city's 2020 Comprehensive Annual Financial Report, the top employers in the city are:

Hospitals
There are two hospitals in Moreno Valley:
 Kaiser Permanente Community Hospital, formerly Moreno Valley Community Hospital, is a General Acute Care Hospital with Basic Emergency Services as of 2008. Kaiser Permanente officially acquired the Moreno Valley Community Hospital and took complete control in July 2008. Current Kaiser Permanente members began receiving notification of the purchase in March 2008. Moreno Valley residents will not feel the effects of the acquisition immediately, as Kaiser Permanente members were asked to continue using the nearby Riverside facility and the Moreno Valley Clinic for hospital services while the transition process is completed. Kaiser Permanente is planning to increase the size and capacity of the new hospital by adding a new 80+ patient tower and expanding the main facility, as well as increasing the size of the emergency and operating rooms.
 Riverside County Regional Medical Center is a General Acute Care Hospital with Basic Emergency Services and a Level I Trauma Center.

Notable people

 Da'Mon Cromartie-Smith: Safety for the Pittsburgh Steelers, graduated from Rancho Verde High School in 2005
 Greg Dobbs: Third baseman for Philadelphia Phillies graduated from Canyon Springs High School in 1996
 Lindsay Ellingson: Model, graduated from Canyon Springs High School
 Becky G: Rapper, singer and dancer;  partially lived in Moreno Valley
 Elisabeth Harnois: American actress, attended Canyon Springs High School
 Sumaya Kazi: Award-winning Entrepreneur, graduated from Canyon Springs High School in 2000
 Bobby Kielty: Professional baseball player with the Boston Red Sox, graduated from Canyon Springs High School
 Kawhi Leonard: Professional basketball player with the Los Angeles Clippers, attended Palm Middle School and Canyon Springs High School
 Ryan Madson: Washington Nationals pitcher, graduated from Valley View High School in 1998
 Andre McGee: College basketball player for the University of Louisville, (Jersey Number 33), graduated from Canyon Springs High School in 2005
 Charlotte Morgan: Softball player, played for the Alabama Crimson Tide and was drafted first overall in the 2010 National Pro Fastpitch Senior Draft
 Leonard A. Patrick: Major General, United States Air Force,  operations Desert Shield and Desert Storm, Graduated from Moreno Valley High School in 1977.
 Troy Percival: Former Anaheim Angels All-Star Pitcher, World Series Champion, attended Moreno Valley High School
 Ronald Powell: Professional football player, graduated from Rancho Verde High School in 2010
 D'Aundre Reed: 2011 NFL Draftee to the Minnesota Vikings, graduated from Rancho Verde High School in 2006
 Terrelle Smith: Fullback for Arizona Cardinals graduated from Canyon Springs High School in 1996 was also made the Pro Bowl
 Tyron Smith: Dallas Cowboys offensive lineman, graduated from Rancho Verde High School in 2008
 Michael Snaer: American college basketball player for Florida State University, Graduated from Rancho Verde High School in 2009*
 Michael Sorich: American actor, writer and director,  a prominent and ever-present voice actor in the Power Rangers franchise, Graduated from Moreno Valley High School in 1975.  
 Kyle Turley: Kansas City Chiefs star graduated from Valley View High School
 Derrick Ward: New York Giants running back graduated from Valley View High School
 Beverly Yanez: Former American professional soccer forward and midfielder who played for Reign FC in the National Women's Soccer League. Raised in Moreno Valley and attended Moreno Valley High School in 2004.

References

External links

 
 
 Moreno Valley Chamber of Commerce
 

 
Cities in Riverside County, California
Incorporated cities and towns in California
Populated places established in 1984
1984 establishments in California
Chicano and Mexican neighborhoods in California